Fabián Bielinsky (3 February 1959 – 29 June 2006) was an Argentine film director.

Career 
Fabián Bielinsky was born in Buenos Aires on February 3, 1959. Bielinsky started to make films early in life, while still a high school student in the Colegio Nacional de Buenos Aires. At thirteen years old, he made his first short film, based on the short story Continuity of the Parks by Julio Cortázar. After graduation from high school, Bielinsky started studying psychology, a career he pursued for a short time before dropping out in favor of enrolling in the Centro de Experimentacion y Realizacion Cinematografica (CERC, actually ENERC, INCAA's film school). He graduated in 1983 with a short film called La espera, based on a story by Jorge Luis Borges. The short also earned him a prize at the Huesca International Film Festival in Spain.

Bielinsky entered the film industry around 1983 as an assistant director, working under such filmmakers as Miguel Pérez, Carlos Soria and Eliseo Subiela. He also worked on a Mégane commercial that Wim Wenders was filming in Argentina. Beilinsky wrote the script for the 1998 film La sonámbula, recuerdos del futuro (released abroad as Sleepwalker), directed by Fernando Spiner.

Bielinsky directed his first film, Nine Queens in 2000, a crime thriller about a scam involving forged stamps. The film was very successful both in Argentina and abroad, and earned seven Silver Condor awards, including Best Film, Best Director and Best Original Screenplay. Bielinsky was offered by several Hollywood companies to remake the film in English, but he refused, as he didn't want his first two films to be the same. The American remake, Criminal, was produced by Steven Soderbergh and released in 2004.

Bielinsky directed his second film, The Aura, in 2005. Ricardo Darín, who played the lead in Nine Queens, also played the lead role in The Aura. While not as financially successful as Nine Queens, it received just as much critical praise. Critics noted how The Aura dropped many of the black comedy elements of Nine Queens in favor of a more atmospheric and cerebral noir. The film won Best Film, Best Director and Best Original Screenplay at the Silver Condor awards. The film was the Argentine entry for the Best Foreign Language Film at the 78th Academy Awards.

In both of his films various characters mention "El Turco", a powerful underworld figure who is never shown on screen.

Personal life and legacy 
Bielinsky was married and had one child. A month before Bielinsky was going to present The Aura at the Edinburgh International Film Festival, he died from a heart attack in his sleep in São Paulo, Brazil, while casting for an advertisement.

In 2011, he was posthumously awarded a Konex Award as one of the 5 best film directors of the decade in Argentina.

References

External links
 
 BBC Movies. 8 July 2002. Interview.
 Clarín. 29 June 2006. Murió Fabián Bielinsky, director de "El Aura" y "Nueve Reinas".
 Página/12. 29 June 2006. El adiós a un talento de alto vuelo

1959 births
2006 deaths
Argentine film directors
People from Buenos Aires
Argentine people of Polish-Jewish descent
Argentine Jews